Borowitz may refer to:
Borovnice (Trutnov District) (Groß Borowitz), German name of the Czech village and municipality in the Trutnov District
Borovnička (Klein Borowitz), German name of the Czech village and municipality in the Trutnov District

The surname Borowitz is derived from these villages.

List of people with the surname Borowitz
Abram Solman Borowitz (1910–1985), American humorist, author, and director
Andy Borowitz (born 1958), American writer, comedian, satirist, and actor
Eugene Borowitz (1924–2016), American leader and philosopher in Reform Judaism
Susan Borowitz (born 1959), American television writer and producer

See also 
Borowica (disambiguation)
Borovský